Mozhaysk is a railway station of Belorussky suburban railway line in Mozhaysk town, Moscow Oblast, Russia.

History 
The station was founded in 1870.

Station building was built in 1856 — 1876.

Description 
The station placed in south-west end of Mozhaysk.
The station has two platforms: 1 side low platform (not uses now) nearby station building and 1 island high platform.
Platforms and the town linked by overground pedestrian bridge.

The station has turnstiles and ticket printing machines.

Traffic 
Mozhaysk station is a finish point for:
 some regular suburban trains from Moscow;
 all suburban expresses "REKS" Moscow — Mozhaysk;
 all regular suburban trains Gagarin — Mozhaysk and Vyazma — Mozhaysk.

All Lastochkas Moscow — Smolensk and regular suburban trains Moscow — Borodino (and reversed) have stops on the station.

Other inter-city trains go through the station without stopping.

Gallery

References

External links 
 Timetables of trains: on the tutu.ru, on the Yandex Raspisaniya.
 Information about station on the official website of the RZD

Railway stations in Moscow Oblast
Railway stations of Moscow Railway
Railway stations in the Russian Empire opened in 1870
Cultural heritage monuments in Moscow Oblast